Group work is a form of voluntary association of members benefiting from cooperative learning, that enhances the total output of the activity than when  done individually. It aims to cater for individual differences, and develop skills such as communication skills, collaborative skills, critical thinking skills, etc.  It is also meant to develop generic knowledge and socially acceptable attitudes.  Through group work, a "group mind" - conforming to standards of behavior and judgement - can be fostered.

Specifically in psychotherapy and social work, "group work" refers to group therapy, offered by a practitioner trained in psychotherapy, psychoanalysis, counseling or other relevant disciplines.

Social group work 

Social group work is a method of social work that helps persons to enhance their social functioning through purposeful group experiences and to cope more effectively with their personal, group or community problems (Marjorie Murphy, 1959).

Social group work, is a primary modality of social work in bringing about positive change, it is defined as an educational process emphasizing the development and social adjustment of an individual through voluntary association and use of this association as a means of furthering socially desirable end. It is a psycho social process which is concerned in developing leadership and cooperation with building on the interests of the group for a social purpose. Social group work is a method through which individuals in groups in social agency setting are helped by a worker who guides their interaction through group activities so that they may relate to others and experience growth opportunities in accordance with their needs and capacities to the individual, group and community development. It aims at the development of persons through the interplay of personalities in group situation and at the creation of such group situation as provide for integrated, cooperative group action for common ends. It is also a process and a method through which group life is affected by worker who consciously directs the interacting process towards the accomplishment of goals which are conceived in a democratic frame of reference. Its distinct characteristics lies in the fact that group work is used with group experience as a means of individual growth and development, and that the group worker is concerned in developing social responsibility and active citizenship for the improvement of democratic society. Group work is a way to serving individual within and through small face to face group in order to bring about the desired change among the client participants.

Models
There are four models in social group work:
 
 Remedial model (Vinter, R. D., 1967) – Remedial model focuses on the individuals dysfunction and utilizes the group as a context and means for altering deviant behaviour. 
 Reciprocal or Mediating model (W. Schwartz, 1961) - A model based on open systems theory, humanistic psychology and existential perspective. Relationship rooted in reciprocal transactions and intensive commitment is considered critical in this model.
 Developmental model (Berustein, S. & Lowy, 1965) - A model based on Erikson's ego psychology, group dynamics and conflict theory. In this model groups are seen as having "a degree of independence and autonomy, but the dynamics of to and fro flow between them and their members, between them and their social settings, are considered crucial to their existence, viability and achievements". The connectedness (intimacy and closeness) is considered critical in this model.
 Social goals model (Gisela Konopka & Weince, 1964) - A model based on 'programming' social consciousness, social  responsibility, and  social change. It suggests that democratic participation with others in a group situation can promote enhancement of personal function in individuals, which in-turn can affect social change. It results in heightened self-esteem and a rise in social power for the members of the group collectively and as individuals.

Functions of Social Group Worker 
The American Association of Group Workers (1949) describes as: 
“The group worker enables various types of groups to function in such a way that both group interaction and programme activities contribute to the  growth  of  the individual,  and  the  achievement  of  the  desirable  social goal. The objectives of the group worker include provision for personal growth according to individual capacity and need; the adjustment of the individual to other persons, to groups and to society, the motivation of the individual toward the improvement of society and;  the recognition by the individual of his own rights, abilities and differences of others. Through his participation the group worker aims to effect the group process so that decisions come about as a result of knowledge and a sharing and integration of ideas, experiences and knowledge, rather than as a result of domination from within or without the group. Social Work Intervention with Individuals and Groups through experience he/she aims to produce those relationship with other groups and the wider community which contributes to responsible citizenship, mutual understanding between cultural, religious, economic or special groupings in the community, and a participation in the constant improvement of our society towards democratic goals. The guiding purpose behind such leadership rests upon the common assumptions  of  a  democratic society; namely, the opportunity for each individual to fulfill his capacities in freedom, to respect and appreciate others and to assume his social responsibility in maintaining and constantly improving our democratic societies. Underlying the practice of group work is the knowledge of individual and group behaviour and of social conditions and community relations which is based on the modern social sciences. On the basis of this knowledge the group worker contributes to the group with which he works with a skill in leadership which enables the members to use their capacities to the full and to create socially constructive group activities. According to the interests and needs of each, he assists them to get from the group experience, the satisfaction provided by the programme activities, the enjoyment and personal growth available through the social relations, and the opportunity to participate as a responsible citizen. The group worker makes conscious use of his relations to the group, his knowledge of programme as a tool and his understanding of the individual and of the group process and recognizes his responsibility both to individuals and groups with whom he works and the larger social values he represents”.

Group work in psychology 

Group work in psychology is done with a smaller number of participants for controlled effectiveness. It is an ethical practice that aims to bring out a collective positive behavioral

generating a broad array of possible alternative points of view or solutions to a problem
giving clients a chance to work on a goal that might appear too large or complex for an individual
allowing clients with different backgrounds to bring their special knowledge, experience, or skills to a project, and to explain their orientation to others
giving clients a chance to teach and contribute to each other
giving clients a structured experience so their problem solving ideas are encouraged with a set of new practice skills applicable to their subjective environmental situations

Brainstorming is a method used to generate ideas. Participants mention ideas in any order (without others' commenting, disagreeing or asking too many questions). The advantage of brainstorming is that ideas do not become closely associated with the individuals who suggested them. This process encourages creative thinking, if it is not rushed and if all ideas are written down (and therefore, for the time-being, accepted). A disadvantage: when ideas are suggested quickly, it is more difficult for shy participants or for those who are not speaking their native language. One approach is to begin by brainstorming and then go around the group in a more structured way asking each person to add to the list.

See also 
Social case work

Further reading
Douglas, Tom (1976), Group Work Practice, International Universities Press, New York.
Konopka, G. (1963), Social Group Work : A Helping Process, Prentice Hall, Englewood Cliffs.
Treeker, H.B. (1955), Social Group Work, Principles and Practices, Whiteside, New York.
Phillips, Helen, U. (1957), Essential of Social Group Work Skill, Association Press, New York.

References 

 Harleigh B. Trecker, Social Group Work: Principles and Practices, Association Press, 1972 
 Joan Benjamin, Judith Bessant and Rob Watts. Making Groups Work: Rethinking Practice, Allen & Unwin, 1997 
 Ellen Sarkisian, "Working in Groups." Working in Groups - A Quick Guide for Students, Derek Bok Center, Harvard University

Group psychotherapy
Group processes
Social work